"No Bravery" is a pop rock song written by British singer James Blunt and Sacha Skarbek for Blunt's debut album Back to Bedlam. The song was produced by Tom Rothrock and Jimmy Hogarth and received a positive reception from music critics. The song is written about Kosovo war while Blunt was serving there with NATO peacekeepers. It was released as the fifth single in April 2006, exclusively in France. The track peaked at No. 15 there.

Release
The single was released on one physical format, including the album version of the track backed with an exclusive live version recorded at 93 Feet East in London.

Music video
"No Bravery" featured a music video that was directed by Paul Heyes and was filmed on 11 February 2006 in The Far East. In the video, Blunt is featured walking through a Kosovo war zone, reflecting on his army days and remembering events that made him into the man he is today. The video also shows the death of a British soldier and the heartache of his family.

Track listings
 "No Bravery" – 4:02
 "No Bravery" (Live) – 3:33

Release history

Chart performance

See also
Incident at Pristina airport

References

2000s ballads
2006 singles
James Blunt songs
Songs written by James Blunt
Pop ballads
Rock ballads
Songs about the military
Songs written by Sacha Skarbek
2004 songs
Atlantic Records singles
Custard Records singles
Song recordings produced by Tom Rothrock
Anti-war songs